Premika Pamela Pasinetti (born 17 July 1993) is a Thai-Italian model and beauty pageant titleholder, who was crowned Miss Grand Thailand in 2017. At the Miss Grand International 2017 pageant, she was awarded Miss Paradise Cape Heritage, and she finished in the Top 10.

Personal life
She has Thai-Italian ancestry, and is fluent in Thai, Italian and English. She studied Business Administration at Assumption University, Thailand.

Career
Pasinetti is a host on Zaab Plaza, a Thai variety show about food, travel and career opportunities to promote local economy, tourism and expenditure in Thailand.

References

External links
Miss Grand Thailand

1993 births
Living people
Pamela Pasinetti
Pamela Pasinetti
Pamela Pasinetti
Miss Grand International contestants